The Harp Creek Bridge is a historic bridge in rural northern Newton County, Arkansas, carrying Arkansas Highway 7 across Harp Creek in the hamlet of Harrison. It is an open-spandrel arch bridge, built out of reinforced concrete in 1928 by the Luten Bridge Company. The arches span , and are mounted on piers set  from the abutments. Concrete balustrades line the sides of the bridge.

The bridge was listed on the National Register of Historic Places in 1990.

See also
List of bridges documented by the Historic American Engineering Record in Arkansas
List of bridges on the National Register of Historic Places in Arkansas
National Register of Historic Places listings in Newton County, Arkansas

References

External links

Historic American Engineering Record in Arkansas
Road bridges on the National Register of Historic Places in Arkansas
Bridges completed in 1928
1928 establishments in Arkansas
National Register of Historic Places in Newton County, Arkansas
Concrete bridges in the United States
Steel bridges in the United States
Open-spandrel deck arch bridges in the United States
Luten bridges